

History
The first rugby club which founded in Bulgaria is ZSK Lokomotiv Sofia.

Bulgarian rugby union teams
Lokomotiv Sofia